José Ruiz may refer to:
 José Ruiz y Blasco (1838–1913), Spanish painter, father of Pablo Picasso
 José Ruíz Matos (1966–1992), Puerto Rican boxer
 José Oliver Ruiz (born 1974), Colombian weightlifter
 José Francisco Ruiz (1783–1840), Texas revolutionary and politician
 José Carlos Ruiz (born 1936), Mexican film actor
 José Martínez Ruiz (1873–1967), Spanish writer and literary critic
 José Julio Ruiz (born 1985), Cuban baseball player
 José Ruiz (footballer) (1904–1962), Mexican footballer
 José Ruiz (sailor) (born 1980), sailor
 José Jair Ruíz (born 1995), Mexican footballer
 José Ruiz (baseball) (born 1994), baseball player
 José Ruiz (futsal player) (born 1983), Spanish futsal player
 José Jesús Ruíz (born 1992), Mexican footballer
 José Luis Ruiz (born 1952), Spanish long-distance runner
 José Manuel Ruiz Reyes (born 1978), Spanish table tennis player
 José Ruiz, Cuban plantation owner, defendant in the Amistad Case
 José Ruiz, French head coach of the Mali national basketball team